The 1954 United States Senate election in Iowa took place on November 2, 1954. Incumbent Democratic Senator Guy Gillette ran for re-election to a second term but was defeated by Republican U.S. Representative Thomas E. Martin.

This was the fifth consecutive election in which the incumbent lost and this seat changed parties.

General election

Candidates
Guy Gillette, incumbent Senator (Democratic)
Thomas E. Martin, U.S. Representative from Des Moines (Republican)
Ernest J. Seemann, perennial candidate (Republicsons)

Results

See also 
 1954 United States Senate elections

References 

1954
Iowa
United States Senate